St. Nedela (Macedonian: Света Недела), also known as St. Sunday (Nedela), is a Macedonian Orthodox Church located in Ajax, Ontario, Canada.

Background
In 1993, a group of Macedonian Canadians from the Durham Region got together and decided to establish a church for the religious needs of the Macedonians in Ajax and the surrounding areas. After many meetings, ideas, fund raising and discussions the group found a location at Bayly St and Westney Rd in Ajax. Years later a new church was built and blessed by Archbishop Stephen, Archbishop of Ohrid and Macedonia.

, the church managed a Macedonian community center, a banquet hall accommodating up to 250 guests, a woman's auxiliary, Sunday school and a folklore dancing group.

References

External links
St. Nedela Macedonian Orthodox Church Facebook
Facebook Group Page
St. Nedela's Facebook Group Page
St. Nedela's Macedonian Language Cultural Studies for Children
American-Canadian Macedonian Orthodox Diocese
Official Website of the Macedonian Orthodox Church
Official Church Website
American-Canadian Macedonian Orthodox Diocese
Official Website of the Macedonian Orthodox Church

Churches in Ontario
Ajax, Ontario
Buildings and structures in the Regional Municipality of Durham
Macedonian Orthodox churches in Canada
Macedonian-Canadian culture